Teebus is a village some 18 km south-west of Steynsburg and 35 km north-north-west of Hofmeyr. Afrikaans for 'tea-caddy', this name is taken from that of a pointed hill; to the north of this hill is Koffiebus, 'coffee-caddy'.

References

Populated places in the Walter Sisulu Local Municipality